Independence March may refer to:

 İstiklal Marşı, Turkey
 Independence March (Poland)
 March and Rally for Scottish Independence, Scotland